Hilkka Terttu Annikki Kinnunen (born 19 March 1925) is a Finnish actress and opera singer. She led the Operetti Theater from 1959 until 1996 and often even acted as a prima donna performing leading roles.

Life and career 
Kinnunen began her studies in the first annual course of the Suomen Teatterikoulu during the Continuation War in 1943. Before founding the Operetti Theater, she worked at, among others, the Äänislinna Theater, Helsinki's Tyväenteatteri and Kansanteatteri. Before the Operetti Theater, she also appeared in several domestic films, among which is Huhtikuu tulee from 1953.

Aino Kukkonen edited the book Prima-Donna about Kinnusen's life in connection with her 80th birthday in 2005, and the story of Hilkka Kinnusen's youth was told in Lotta-Sofia Saahko's book Coffee and Karelian pies, published in 2021. In 2010, the President of the Republic, Tarja Halonen, awarded theater director Hilkka Kinnune the title of theater councilor for her achievements for the benefit of Finnish musical theatre.

Personal life 
Hilkka Kinnunen was married to actor Ekke Hämäläinen from 1948 to 1971 and to Bill Farrell from 1976 to 1979. Two children were born from the first union, the younger of whom is the actress Vesa Hämes.

Filmography 

 Toukokuun taika (1948) - Inga Adlerfeldt
 Vihaan sinua - rakas (1951) - Miss Laaksola
 The Apple Falls (1952) - Susan
 Maailman kaunein tyttö (1953) - Teacher
 Song of Warsaw (1953) - Perämies Koskisen vaimo
 Huhtikuu tulee (1953) - Annikki Teräs
 Yhteinen vaimomme (1956) - Rouva
 Syntipukki (1957) - Mrs. Beck
 Jouluvene - tähtiparaati (1964)

References 

1925 births
Living people
20th-century Finnish actresses
20th-century Finnish opera singers
Finnish stage actresses
People from Viipuri Province (Grand Duchy of Finland)